
Gmina Węgliniec is an urban-rural gmina (administrative district) in Zgorzelec County, Lower Silesian Voivodeship, in south-western Poland.

Neighbouring gminas
Gmina Węgliniec is bordered by the town of Gozdnica and the gminas of Iłowa, Nowogrodziec, Osiecznica, Pieńsk and Przewóz.

Villages
Apart from the town of Węgliniec, the gmina contains the villages of Czerwona Woda, Dębówek, Jagodzin, Kieszków, Kościelna Wieś, Kuźnica, Łężek, Okrąglica, Piaseczna, Piaski, Polana, Ruszów, Stary Węgliniec and Zielonka.

Twin towns – sister cities

Gmina Węgliniec is twinned with:

 Hå, Norway
 Hodkovice nad Mohelkou, Czech Republic
 Horka, Germany
 Kalvarija, Lithuania
 Rothenburg, Germany
 Vyshnivets, Ukraine

References

Wegliniec
Zgorzelec County